Sunacovirus is a subgenus of viruses in the genus Alphacoronavirus, consisting of a single species, Suncus murinus coronavirus X74.

References

Virus subgenera
Alphacoronaviruses